Donald Winkler (born 1940) is a Canadian documentary filmmaker and French-to-English literary translator. He lives in Montreal with his wife Sheila Fischman.

Life and career

Early life
Winkler was born in Winnipeg, Manitoba and grew up loving theatre. He was introduced to French through his mother who studied the language in Romania before coming to Canada when she was fifteen years old. As a student, he took French courses alongside his literary studies at the University of Manitoba where he graduated in 1961. He also went on to do graduate studies at the Yale School of Drama. In his early twenties, he spent a year and a half in Paris teaching English where he enjoyed watching films at the Cinématheque and the little Latin Quarter art houses. When he returned to Canada, he was drawn to Montreal because, for him, it was "the only city in the country at that time cosmopolitan enough". The city was also the headquarters for the National Film Board of Canada, where Winkler first began making films. He applied for an apprenticeship position that did not require film experience and was hired in 1967 when one of the three initial applicants declined the offer. He learned the trade on the job and within a couple of years, began working on his first film.

Film career
Winkler has been an independent filmmaker since leaving the National Film Board where he worked as a documentary film director and writer from 1967 to 1995. His films primarily deal with the arts and culture in Canada. He wrote and directed a number of films that look into the lives of Canadian playwrights, writers and musicians such as Irving Layton, F. R. Scott, P. K. Page, Al Purdy, Earle Birney, Ralph Gustafson and Tomson Highway. In the year 2005, he entered his three films: Moshe Safdie: The Power of Architecture, The Pines of Emily Carr and The Colour of Memory: Conversations with Guido Molinari into the International Festival of Films on Art in Montreal.

Translation
Winkler first began translating Quebec literature in the late 1980s. Although he never studied translation, he has since translated over 25 works including novels, poetry and essays. He is a member of the Literary Translators' Association of Canada. Carmine Starnino describes Winkler as "one of [Canada's] most gifted and highly decorated practitioners." Winkler describes the process of translation as "a constant quest for perfect pitch" and a "sophisticated word game". A successful translation, in his words, gives readers "some sense of what it’s like to be in another culture’s skin". His translations have been described as "seamless" and "wonderful". Sheila Fischman, his spouse, is also an award-winning translator. He describes her as the "doyenne of Canadian literary translation".

Awards and nominations 
Donald Winker has won the Governor General's Award for Translation three times:
 in 1994, for The Lyric Generation: The Life and Times of the Baby-Boomers by François Ricard, 
 in 2011, for Partitia for Glenn Gould by Georges Leroux, 
 and in 2013, for The Major Verbs by Pierre Nepveu. 
His work was also nominated for the Governor General's Award on three separate occasions.

Donald Winkler was nominated for the Giller Prize twice:
 in 2007, for A Secret Between Us by Daniel Poliquin,
 and in 2015, for Arvida by Samuel Archibald
In addition, he won the Quebec Writers’ Federation’s Cole Foundation Translation Prize for his translation of The Major Verbs by Pierre Nepveu, and in 1987, he received an honorable mention at the Literary Translators’ Association of Canada’s John Glassco Prize for Literary Translation for his translation entitled Rose and Thorn: The Selected Poetry by Roland Giguère. Winkler's translation of Arvida by Samuel Archibald was also short-listed for the 2016 Best Translated Book Awards.

List of Translations

Further reading 
 http://news.nationalpost.com/arts/books/swearing-in-translation
 http://www.cbc.ca/books/2016/04/giller-finalist-samuel-archibald-nominated-for-20k-international-book-prize.html
 http://www.asymptotejournal.com/blog/2015/11/30/oh-canada-a-new-translation-by-donald-winkler-of-samuel-archibalds-arvida/
 https://www.kirkusreviews.com/book-reviews/samuel-archibald/arvida/
 http://books2.scholarsportal.info/viewdoc.html?id=/ebooks/ebooks3/upress/2014-01-23/1/9780773589858
 http://books1.scholarsportal.info/viewdoc.html?id=/ebooks/ebooks0/gibson_crkn/2009-12-01/3/405763&page=176

References

1940 births
Canadian documentary film directors
National Film Board of Canada people
Canadian translators
Governor General's Award-winning translators
Living people
Film directors from Winnipeg
Film directors from Montreal
University of Manitoba alumni
Yale School of Drama alumni
Anglophone Quebec people